The 2nd Legislative Assembly of Singapore was a meeting of the Legislative Assembly of Singapore from 1 July 1959 until 3 September 1963.

Officeholders 

 Speaker: Sir George Oehlers
 Deputy Speaker:
 G. Kandasamy (PAP) until 24 September 1961
 John Mammen (PAP) from 16 November 1961
 Prime Minister: Lee Kuan Yew (PAP)
 Deputy Prime Minister: Toh Chin Chye (PAP)
 Leader of the Opposition: Lim Yew Hock (SPA)
 Leader of the House: Toh Chin Chye (PAP)
 Party Whip of the People's Action Party: Lee Khoon Choy

Composition

Members 
This is the list of members of the 2nd Legislative Assembly of Singapore elected in the 1959 general election.

Changes in members

By-elections

Vacant seats

Changes in party affiliation

References 

Singapore government policies
Legislative branch of the Singapore Government
Parliament of Singapore